The BBC Radio 3 Awards for World Music was an award given to world music artists between 2002 and 2008, sponsored by BBC Radio 3. The award was thought up by fRoots magazine's editor Ian Anderson, inspired by the BBC Radio 2 Folk Awards. Until 2006, the awards panel was chaired by Charlie Gillett and the awards shows co-ordinated by Alex Webb.

Categories
Award categories included: Africa, Asia/Pacific, Americas, Europe, Mid East and North Africa, Newcomer, Culture Crossing, Club Global, Album of the Year, and Audience Award. Initial lists of nominees in each category were selected annually by a panel of several thousand industry experts. Shortlisted nominees were voted on by a twelve-member jury, which selected the winners in every category except for the Audience Award category. These jury members were appointed and presided over by the BBC.

Award ceremonies
The annual awards ceremony was held at various venues including the Ocean in Hackney, Sage in Gateshead, the Usher Hall in Edinburgh, the Brixton Academy and finally at the BBC Proms. Winners were given an award called a "Planet," designed by Croatian sculptor Anita Sulimanovic in 2003.

In March 2009, the BBC made a decision to axe the BBC Radio 3 Awards for World Music.

2003 winners 
The Awards concert took place on 24 March 2003. The award recipients were as follows:
Africa
 Winner: Orchestra Baobab
 Runners-up: Bembeya Jazz, Kassé Mady Diabaté, Tony Allen
Asia/Pacific
 Winner: Mahwash & Ensemble Kaboul
 Runners-up: Te Vaka, Trilok Gurtu, Alka Yagnik

Americas
 Winner: Los de Abajo
 Runners-up: Susana Baca, Yusa, Lila Downs

Europe
 Winner: Mariza
 Runners-up: Ojos de Brujo, Kimmo Pohjonen, Sergey Starostin

Middle East and North Africa
 Winner: Samira Said.
 Runners-up: Kayhan Kalhor, Omar Faruk Tekbilek, Yair Dalal

Newcomer
 Winner: Gotan Project
 Runners-up: DuOuD, Mariza, Yusa

Boundary Crossing
 Winner: Ellika & Solo
 Runners-up: Papa Noel & Papi Oviedo, Oi Va Voi, Gotan Project

Critics Award
 Winner: Orchestra Baobab
 Runners-up: Eliza Carthy, Salif Keita, Youssou N'Dour

Sources: 2003 nominees and winners

2004 winners 
Africa
 Winner: Daara J
 Runners-up:  Cesária Évora, Oumou Sangaré, Rokia Traoré

Asia/Pacific
 Winner: Sevara Nazarkhan
 Runners-up: Huun-Huur-Tu, Trilok Gurtu, Munojot Yo‘lchiyeva

Americas
 Winner: Ibrahim Ferrer
 Runners-up: Omar Sosa, Caetano Veloso, Tribalistas

Europe
 Winner: Ojos de Brujo
 Runners-up: Kroke, Radio Tarifa, Tamara Obrovac

Middle East and North Africa
 Winner: Kadim Al Sahir
 Runners-up: Mercan Dede, Khaled, Souad Massi

Newcomer
 Winner: Warsaw Village Band
 Runners-up: Ojos de Brujo, Cibelle, Sevara Nazarkhan

Boundary Crossing
 Winner:  Think Of One
 Runners-up: Bob Brozman, Manu Chao, DuOud

Club Global
 Winner: DJ Dolores and Orchestra Santa Massa
 Runners-up: Mercan Dede, Panjabi MC, Zuco 103

Critics Award
 Winner: Rokia Traoré
 Runners-up: Abyssinia Infinite, John Spiers and Jon Boden, Oi Va Voi

Audience Award
 Winner: Kadim Al Sahir
 Runners-up: Cesária Évora, Sevara Nazarkhan, Tamara Obrovac

Source: 2004 winners and nominees

2005 winners 
The hosts for the BBC Awards for World Music 2005 Poll Winners' Concert were Eliza Carthy and Benjamin Zephaniah. The award recipients were as follows:

Africa
 Winner: Tinariwen
 Runners-up:  Thandiswa Mazwai, Rokia Traore, Youssou N'Dour

Asia/Pacific
 Winner: Kaushiki Chakrabarty
 Runners-up: Faiz Ali Faiz, Sainkho Namtchylak, Sevara Nazarkhan

Americas
 Winner: Lhasa
 Runners-up: Bebel Gilberto, Bajofondo Tango Club, Lila Downs

Europe
 Winner: Amparanoia
 Runners-up: Enzo Avitabile & Bottari, Ivo Papasov, Ojos de Brujo

Middle East and North Africa
 Winner: Khaled
 Runners-up: The Chehade Brothers, Mercan Dede, Souad Massi

Newcomer
 Winner: Chango Spasiuk
 Runners-up: Ba Cissoko, Amparanoia, Yasmin Levy

Boundary Crossing
 Winner:  Bebo Valdés and Diego El Cigala
 Runners-up: Björk, Clotaire K, Lhasa

Club Global
 Winner: Clotaire K
 Runners-up: Gilles Peterson, Gotan Project, Mercan Dede

Critics Award
 Winner: Youssou N'Dour
 Runners-up: Lhasa, Tinariwen, Andrew Cronshaw

Audience Award
 Winner: Ivo Papasov
 Runners-up: The Chehade Brothers, Enzo Avitabile & Bottari, Mercan Dede

Source: 2005 winners and nominees

2006 winners 
Africa
 Winner: Amadou & Mariam
 Runners-up: Emmanuel Jal, Ali Farka Toure, Lura

The Americas
 Winner: Ry Cooder
 Runners-up: Omar Sosa, Carlos Vives, Seu Jorge

Middle East and North Africa
 Winner: Souad Massi
 Runners-up: Ilham al-Madfai, Rachid Taha, Dhafer Youssef

Asia/Pacific
 Winner: Sain Zahoor
 Runners-up: Faiz Ali Faiz, Susheela Raman, Yat-Kha

Europe
 Winner: Fanfare Ciocarlia
 Runners-up: Armenian Navy Band, Enzo Avitabile and Bottari, Mariza

Club Global
 Winner: DJ Shantel
 Runners-up: M.I.A, Cheb i Sabbah, Mercan Dede

Boundary Crossing
 Winners: Nitin Sawhney
 Runners-up: Asha Bhosle and Kronos Quartet, Kimmo Pohjonen, Yasmin Levy

Newcomer
 Winner: Konono N°1
 Runners-up: Dobet Gnahore, Daby Toure, Lura

Album of the Year
 Winner: Amadou and Mariam - Dimanche à Bamako
 Runners-up: Thione Seck - Orientation, Salif Keita - M'Bemba, Ali Farka Toure and Toumani Diabate - In the Heart of the Moon

Audience Award
  Winner: Armenian Navy Band - How Much is Your’s

Source: 2006 winners and nominees

2007 winners 
Africa
 Winner: Mahmoud Ahmed
 Runners-up: Ali Farka Toure, Bongo Maffin, Toumani Diabate

The Americas
 Winner: Gogol Bordello
 Runners-up: Ben Harper, Fonseca, Lila Downs

Middle East and North Africa
 Winner: Ghada Shbeir
 Runners-up: Les Boukakes, Natacha Atlas, Yasmin Levy

Asia/Pacific
 Winner: Debashish Bhattacharya
 Runners-up: Anoushka Shankar, Dadawa, Fat Freddy's Drop

Europe
 Winner: Camille
 Runners-up: Lo'Jo, Mariza, Ojos de Brujo

Club Global
 Winner: Gotan Project
 Runners-up: Balkan Beat Box, Cheb i Sabbah, Mercan Dede

Culture Crossing
 Winner: Maurice El Medioni & Roberto Rodriguez
 Runners-up: Aida Nadeem, Ska Cubano, Think of One

Newcomer
 Winner: K'naan
 Runners-up: Etran Finatawa, Nuru Kane, Sara Tavares

Album of the Year
 Winner: Ali Farka Touré - Savane
 Runners-up: Bellowhead - Burlesque, Lila Downs - La Cantina Narada, Toumani Diabaté and the Symmetric Orchestra - Boulevard de l'Independance

Audience Award
 Winner: Ghada Shbeir

Source: 2007 winners, 2007 nominees

2008 winners 
Africa
 Winner: Bassekou Kouyate & Ngoni Ba
 Runners-up: Simphiwe Dana, Tinariwen, Toumani Diabaté and the Symmetric Orchestra

The Americas
 Winner: Andy Palacio & The Garifuna Collective
 Runners-up: Bajofondo Tango Club, Hazmat Modine, Maria Rita

Middle East and North Africa
 Winner: Rachid Taha
 Runners-up: Malouma, Nass El Ghiwane, The Idan Raichel Project

Asia/Pacific
 Winner: Sa Dingding
 Runners-up: Anoushka Shankar & Karsh Kale, Faiz Ali Faiz, Huun Huur Tu

Europe
 Winner: Son de la Frontera
 Runners-up: Manu Chao, Ojos de Brujo, Thierry 'Titi' Robin

Club Global
 Winner: Transglobal Underground
 Runners-up: Balkan Beat Box, Bajofondo Tango Club, Gaudi & Nusrat Fateh Ali Khan

Culture Crossing
 Winner: Justin Adams & Juldeh Camara
 Runners-up: Balkan Beat Box, Bole2Harlem, The Idan Raichel Project

Newcomer
 Winner: Mayra Andrade
 Runners-up: Balkan Beat Box, Bassekou Kouyate & Ngoni Ba, Vieux Farka Touré

Album of the Year
 Winner: Bassekou Kouyate & Ngoni Ba - Segu Blue
 Runners-up: Andy Palacio & the Garifuna Collective - Wátina, Orchestra Baobab - Made In Dakar, Tinariwen - Aman Iman

Source: 2008 nominees, 2008 winners

See also
Awards for world music

References

World music
British music awards
World music awards
World music
Awards established in 2003
Awards disestablished in 2008